Brandon Duc Allen (born September 5, 1992) is an American football quarterback who is currently a free agent. He played college football at Arkansas and was their starting quarterback from 2013 to 2015. He was drafted by the Jacksonville Jaguars in the sixth round of the 2016 NFL Draft and has also previously been a member of the Los Angeles Rams and Denver Broncos.

Early years
Allen attended Fayetteville High School in Fayetteville, Arkansas. As a senior, he threw for 3,408 yards and 38 touchdowns. He was ranked by Rivals.com as the fifth-best pro-style quarterback recruit.

College career
Allen was redshirted as a freshman in 2011. In 2012, he was the backup to Tyler Wilson. He appeared in five games and started one game after Wilson missed a game because of injury. He finished the season completing 21 of 49 passes for 186 yards with one touchdown and three interceptions.

In 2013, Allen took over as the starting quarterback. He passed for 1,552 yards, completing 49.6 percent of his throws, and threw for 13 touchdowns and 10 interceptions for a team that finished 3–9 under first year head coach Bret Bielema.

As a junior in 2014, Allen had 2,285 passing yards, 20 touchdowns and five interceptions. He was the offensive MVP of the 2014 Texas Bowl, a 31–7 victory against the Texas Longhorns. Allen threw two touchdowns in the game, and Arkansas finished with a 7–6 record.

During his senior year in 2015, Allen threw a then-school record six touchdown passes, and ran in the game winning 2 point conversion in a 53–52 overtime win over Ole Miss. He broke the record two weeks later with seven touchdowns in a 51–50 loss to Mississippi State. He also broke Arkansas' record for career passing touchdowns against Mississippi State. He finished the year with 3,440 passing yards, 30 touchdowns, and eight interceptions for a team that finished 8–5, and beat Kansas State in the 2016 Liberty Bowl, 45–23.

Allen finished his career with 7,463 passing yards, 64 passing touchdowns, and 26 interceptions.

Statistics

Professional career

Jacksonville Jaguars
Allen was drafted by the Jacksonville Jaguars in the sixth round with the 201st overall pick in the 2016 NFL Draft. On May 5, 2016, Allen signed a 4-year $2.48 million contract, which included a $147,687 signing bonus. Allen was the Jaguars third-string quarterback his rookie season behind Blake Bortles and Chad Henne. He was waived by the Jaguars on September 3, 2017, following final roster cuts for the 2017 season.

Los Angeles Rams
On September 4, 2017, Allen was claimed off waivers by the Los Angeles Rams. He was inactive for every game of the season as the Rams' third-string quarterback behind Jared Goff and Sean Mannion. He was placed on injured reserve on December 20, 2017.

On September 18, 2018, Allen was waived by the Rams and was re-signed to the practice squad the next day.

Allen signed a reserve/future contract with the Rams on February 7, 2019. On August 30, 2019, Allen was released as part of final roster cuts.

Denver Broncos 

On September 1, 2019, Allen was claimed off waivers by the Denver Broncos. After an injury to starting quarterback Joe Flacco in week 8 of the 2019 season, Allen stepped in as the starting quarterback. Allen made his first start in Week 9 against the Cleveland Browns. In the game, Allen threw for 193 yards and two touchdowns in the 24–19 win.

Cincinnati Bengals
On August 1, 2020, Allen was signed by the Cincinnati Bengals. He was released on September 5, 2020, and signed to the practice squad the next day. He was promoted to the active roster on November 23, 2020, after starting quarterback Joe Burrow suffered a season-ending injury. On November 25, 2020, the team announced that Allen would start for the Bengals during their Week 12 game against the New York Giants in place of the injured Joe Burrow. In Week 16, against the Houston Texans, he had 371 passing yards and two touchdowns in the 37–31 victory. Allen started the final game for the season against the Baltimore Ravens, where he completed six of 21 passes for 48 yards, two interceptions, and a passer rating of 0.0 as the Bengals lost 3–38.

On March 10, 2021, Allen signed a one-year contract extension with the Bengals.

Allen played his first game of the 2021 season against the Detroit Lions in week 6. Allen threw a touchdown pass to Auden Tate on his only pass attempt of the game, while taking 3 kneel downs at the end of the game. Allen would appear in the Bengals' next game against the Ravens, recording no stats in the 41-17 victory. In week 9, with the game out of reach for the Bengals, Allen would go 1 for 2 for 6 yards passing, while rushing once in the 16-41 loss to the Cleveland Browns. In week 12, Allen would once again see playing time, this time against the Pittsburgh Steelers. Allen threw an incomplete pass on his only passing attempt, and lost a yard on his only rush attempt of the game. Allen started the season finale against the Cleveland Browns where he threw for 136 yards and a touchdown in the 21–16 loss.

Allen re-signed with the Bengals on a one-year contract on March 18, 2022. He was put in at the end of the Week 9 game against the Carolina Panthers due to the Bengals resting their starters for the majority of the 4th quarter. Allen would complete all three of his pass attempts for a total of 22 yards.

NFL career statistics

Personal life
His father, Bobby Allen, is the Razorbacks’ director of high school and NFL relations. He has a younger brother, Austin Allen, who became the starting quarterback for the Razorbacks after Brandon completed his college eligibility. Austin signed with the Tampa Bay Buccaneers as an undrafted free agent following the 2018 NFL Draft. Brandon Allen graduated in 2014 with a degree in recreation and sport management.

References

External links

Cincinnati Bengals bio
Arkansas Razorbacks bio

1992 births
Living people
Sportspeople from Fayetteville, Arkansas
Players of American football from Arkansas
American football quarterbacks
Arkansas Razorbacks football players
Jacksonville Jaguars players
Los Angeles Rams players
Denver Broncos players
Cincinnati Bengals players